Dan Siegel may refer to:

 Dan Siegel (musician), American musician
 Dan Siegel (attorney), American lawyer
 Daniel J. Siegel (born 1957), American physician